Boletín americanista is a peer-reviewed academic journal specialising in the history of the Americas. It was established in 1959 and is published since 2010 on a biannual (semestral) basis. The journal is published by Sección de Historia de América, Facultad de Geografía e Historia of the University of Barcelona. Its current editor is Pilar García Jordán.

Boletín americanista is indexed in the University of La Rioja's bibliographic database Dialnet.

References

History of the Americas journals
Biannual journals
Publications established in 1959
University of Barcelona
Spanish-language journals
1959 establishments in Spain